Amherstia (minor planet designation: 516 Amherstia) was the 8th asteroid discovered by Raymond Smith Dugan, and was named after Amherst College, his alma mater. Amherstia is a large M-type asteroid, with an estimated diameter of 73 km. It follows an eccentric orbit between Jupiter and Mars, with an orbital period of 4.39 years.

In 1989, the asteroid was observed from the Collurania-Teramo Observatory, allowing a light curve to be produced that showed an estimated rotation period of 7.49 hours and a brightness variation of 0.25 ± 0.01 in magnitude.

References

External links
 
 

Background asteroids
Amherstia
Amherstia
Amherst College
M-type asteroids (Tholen)
X-type asteroids (SMASS)
19030920